The 2011 NCAA Division I FCS football season, part of college football in the United States, was organized by the National Collegiate Athletic Association (NCAA) at the Division I Football Championship Subdivision (FCS) level. The season began on September 1, 2011, and concluded with the 2012 NCAA Division I Football Championship Game on January 7, 2012, at Pizza Hut Park in Frisco, Texas. North Dakota State won their first FCS championship, defeating Sam Houston State by a final score of 17–6.

Conference and program changes

New FCS program
 The University of Texas at San Antonio (UTSA), which played its first football season in school history, was technically a new FCS program. However, UTSA announced before the 2011 season that it would transition to the Football Bowl Subdivision (FBS). The Roadrunners played one season as an FCS independent, and under NCAA rules for transitioning programs were ineligible for the FCS playoffs. They then joined the Western Athletic Conference in 2012, but were ineligible for FBS bowl games. UTSA became a full FBS member upon completion of the transition in 2013. The Roadrunners, coached by former Miami head coach Larry Coker, played at the Alamodome in downtown San Antonio.

Conference changes

FCS team wins over FBS teams
 September 3:
 Richmond 23, Duke 21
 Sacramento State 29, Oregon State 28 OT
 September 17:
 Indiana State 44, Western Kentucky 16
 September 24:
 North Dakota State 37, Minnesota 24
 Sam Houston State 48, New Mexico 45 OT
 Southern Utah 41, UNLV 16

Conference standings

Playoff qualifiers

Automatic berths for conference champions
Big Sky Conference – Montana
Big South Conference – Stony Brook
Colonial Athletic Association – Towson
Missouri Valley Football Conference – North Dakota State
Mid-Eastern Athletic Conference – Norfolk State
Northeast Conference – Albany
Ohio Valley Conference – Tennessee Tech
Patriot League – Lehigh
Southern Conference – Georgia Southern
Southland Conference – Sam Houston State

At large qualifiers
Big Sky Conference – Montana State
Colonial Athletic Association – James Madison, Maine, New Hampshire, Old Dominion
Missouri Valley Football Conference – Northern Iowa
Ohio Valley Conference – Eastern Kentucky
Southern Conference – Appalachian State, Wofford
Southland Conference – Central Arkansas

No teams from the conferences that do not have automatic bids—currently the Great West Conference and Pioneer Football League—received bids.

Abstains
Ivy League – Harvard
Southwestern Athletic Conference – Grambling State

Postseason

NCAA Division I playoff bracket

* Host institution

SWAC Championship Game

See also
 2011 NCAA Division I FCS football rankings

References